The 98th Air Refueling Squadron is an inactive United States Air Force unit. Its last assignment was with the 92d Operations Group at Fairchild Air Force Base, Washington, where it was inactivated on 1 July 1998.

Two of the squadron's predecessors were formed during World War II under the name 398th Bombardment Squadron.  The first was a Third Air Force medium bomber Operational Training Unit, which was disbanded when the Army Air Forces reorganized its training units in the spring of 1944.  The second was a very heavy operational unit that participated in the strategic bombing campaign against Japan, earning two Distinguished Unit Citations before inactivating in the Philippines after V-J Day.  They were consolidated with the 98th in 1985.

The 98th Air Refueling Squadron was a Strategic Air Command tanker unit.  It was active twice during the 1950s, then served with Boeing KC-135 Stratotankers from 1963 to 1998.  It was converted to provisional status as an expeditionary unit in 2002.

History

World War II

Medium bomber operational training unit
Established in January 1942 as North American B-25 Mitchell medium bomber Operational Training Unit (OTU) for Third Air Force.  Became Martin B-26 Marauder OTU in June 1942, also flew antisubmarine patrols over the Gulf of Mexico.

B-29 Superfortress operations against Japan
Reactivated in March 1944 as a Boeing B-29 Superfortress Very Heavy bombardment squadron.  When training was completed moved to North Field (Tinian) in the Mariana Islands of the Central Pacific Area in January 1945 and assigned to XXI Bomber Command, Twentieth Air Force. Its mission was the strategic bombardment of the Japanese Home Islands and the destruction of its war-making capability.

Flew "shakedown" missions against Japanese targets on Moen Island, Truk, and other points in the Caroline Islands and Marianas.  The squadron began combat missions over Japan on 25 February 1945 with a firebombing mission over Northeast Tokyo.  The squadron continued to participate in wide area firebombing attack, but the first ten-day blitz resulting in the Army Air Forces running out of incendiary bombs. Until then the squadron flew conventional strategic bombing missions using high explosive bombs.

The squadron continued attacking urban areas with incendiary raids until the end of the war in August 1945, attacking major Japanese cities, causing massive destruction of urbanized areas.  Also conducted raids against strategic objectives, bombing aircraft factories, chemical plants, oil refineries, and other targets in Japan. The squadron flew its last combat missions on 14 August when hostilities ended.  Afterwards, its B 29s carried relief supplies to Allied prisoner of war camps in Japan and Manchuria.

Squadron was largely demobilized on Tinian during the fall of 1945.  Remained in Western Pacific, assigned to Twentieth Air Force.  Moved to Clark Field in the Philippines in March 1946. Inactivated at Clark Field on Luzon on 15 June 1946; its low-hour aircraft flown to storage depots in the United States.

United States Air Force
On 16 August 1950 the 98th Air Refueling Squadron was activated at Spokane Air Force Base, Washington and assigned to the 98th Bombardment Group, Medium while flying the KB-29.  It was inactivated on 8 April 1952, but activated the same day at MacDill Air Force Base, Florida where it was attached to the 6th Air Division.  It remained at MacDill until November 1953, when it moved to Lake Charles Air Force Base, Louisiana, where it was inactivated and its personnel and Boeing KC-97 Stratofreighters were used to form the 68th Air Refueling Squadron.

The 98th Air Refueling Squadron was activated again at Lincoln Air Force Base, Nebraska when the 98th wing returned from the Far East in 1954.  Made up of former members of the 55th Air Refueling Squadron from Forbes Air Force Base, Kansas.  Inactivated in 1963 when Strategic Air Command's medium strategic bomber forces began to be drawn down in favor of ICBMs.  In 1985 the 98th was consolidated with the two 398th Bombardment Squadrons.  It was redesignated the 98th Air Refueling Squadron, Heavy on 19 September 1986 and then renamed the 98th Air Refueling Squadron on 1 April 1994 at Fairchild Air Force Base, Washington, flying KC-135T Stratotanker aircraft.  The 98th was again inactivated in 1998 as the Air Force drew down after the end of the Cold War.

In 2002 the squadron was converted to provisional status and redesignated the 98th Expeditionary Air Refueling Squadron and assigned to Air Mobility Command to activate or inactivate as needed.

Operations and decorations 
 Combat Operations: Antisubmarine patrols in the Gulf of Mexico, 8 June 1942 and 31 Jul-8 Aug 1942.  Combat in Western Pacific, 16 Jun-14 Aug 1945.
 Campaigns:  World War II: Antisubmarine, American Theater; Air Offensive, Japan; Eastern Mandates; Western Pacific.

Lineage
398th Bombardment Squadron (Medium)
 Constituted as the 8th Reconnaissance Squadron (Medium) on 13 January 1942
 Activated on 1 February 1942
 Redesignated 398th Bombardment Squadron (Medium) on 22 April 1942
 Disbanded on 10 October 1943
 Consolidated on 19 September 1985 with the 398th Bombardment Squadron, Very Heavy and the 98th Air Refueling Squadron as the 98th Air Refueling Squadron

398th Bombardment Squadron, Very Heavy
 Constituted as the 398th Bombardment Squadron, Very Heavy on 28 February 1944
 Activated on 11 March 1944
 Inactivated on 15 June 1946
 Consolidated on 19 September 1985 with the 398th Bombardment Squadron, Very Heavy and the 98th Air Refueling Squadron as the 98th Air Refueling Squadron

98th Air Refueling Squadron
 Constituted as the 98th Air Refueling Squadron, Medium on 1 August 1950
 Activated on 16 August 1950
 Inactivated on 8 April 1952
 Activated on 8 April 1952
 Inactivated on 25 November 1953
 Activated on 18 February 1954
 Inactivated on 7 January 1963
 Consolidated on 19 September 1985 with the 398th Bombardment Squadron (Medium) and the 398th Bombardment Squadron, Very Heavy
 Redesignated 98th Air Refueling Squadron, Heavy on 19 September 1986 (remained inactive)
 Redesignated 98th Air Refueling Squadron on 1 April 1994 and activated
 Inactivated on 30 September 1998
 Redesignated 98th Expeditionary Air Refueling Squadron  and converted to provisional status on 12 June 2002

Assignments
 21st Bombardment Group, attached 1 February 1942, and assigned 22 April 1942 – 10 October 1943
 504th Bombardment Group, 11 March 1944 – 15 June 1946
 98th Bombardment Group, 16 August 1950 – 8 April 1952 (attached to 98th Bombardment Wing after 14 February 1951
 98th Bombardment Group, 8 April 1952 (attached to 6th Air Division)
 98th Bombardment Wing, 16 June 1952 (attached to 6th Air Division)
 6th Air Division, 1 July 1953
 806th Air Division, 22 November 1953 – 25 November 1953
 98th Bombardment Wing, 18 February 1954 – 15 April 1964
 92d Wing (later 92d Air Refueling Wing), 1 April 1994 – 30 September 1998
 Air Mobility Command to activate or inactivate as needed after 12 June 2002
 Air Combat Command to activate or inactivate as needed, 19 March 2003

Stations

 Bowman Field, Kentucky, 1 February 1942
 Jackson Army Air Base, Mississippi, 8 February 1942
 Columbia Army Air Base, South Carolina, 24 April 1942
 Key Field, Mississippi, 26 May 1942
 MacDill Field, Florida, 28 June 1942 – 10 October 1943
 Dalhart Army Air Field, Texas, 11 March 1944

 Fairmont Army Air Field, Nebraska, 12 March-5 November 1944
 North Field, Mariana Islands, 23 December 1944
 Clark Field, Luzon, Philippines, 13 March-15 June 1946
 Spokane Air Force Base (later Fairchild Air Force Base, Washington, 16 August 1950 – 8 April 1952
 MacDill Air Force Base, Florida, 8 April 1952
 Lake Charles Air Force Base, Louisiana, 22 November 1953 – 25 November 1953
 Lincoln Air Force Base, Nebraska, 16 April 1954 – 7 January 1963
 Fairchild Air Force Base, Washington, 19 September 1986 – 30 September 1998

Aircraft

 North American B-25 Mitchell, 1942
 Martin B-26 Marauder, 1942–1943
 Boeing B-17 Flying Fortress, 1944
 Boeing B-29 Superfortress, 1944–1946

 Boeing KB-29 Superfortress, 1950–1952
 Boeing KC-97, 1952–1960
 Boeing KC-135 Stratotanker, 1960–1963; 1986–1998

References

Notes

Bibliography

 
 
 
 

098
Military units and formations established in 1950